"Done for Me" is a song by American singer-songwriter Charlie Puth, featuring guest vocals from American singer Kehlani. It was written by Puth, Kehlani, Jacob Kasher, John Ryan and produced by Puth, it was released by Atlantic Records on March 15, 2018, as the third single from Puth's sophomore studio album, Voicenotes (2018).

Background
The artists first teased the duet a day before its release, with a black-and-white photo of the two, which was captioned with the release date. The song premiered on Beats 1, where Puth revealed to host Zane Lowe about collaborating with Kehlani: "You know when you meet somebody and you just know that you're going to be friends with them for a really really long time? That was [them] when I met [them]. [They]'re just such a warm and outgoing person and just such a good distinct voice." He also added that they have been "looking forward to doing something together" ever since they covered "Hotline Bling" in 2015. But I just went home played these, I have my little Juno keyboard over there that I had. I had gotten it that night and I just hit one of these settings here and just played a B-minor cord and it just made me think of Wham!, it made me think of 1988, and I put that chord down and I immediately thought of Kehlani too," he said of the recording process.

Composition
"Done for Me" is a pop and neo soul ballad that features a "liquid", "electronic" bass line, "a couple synth horns and some vaguely stoney reverb", as well as a "dejected, inward-looking vibe" and "warm synthesizers reminiscent of classic '80s pop". According to Puth, there are "no pop chords in the song but it's a pop song", and it draws inspiration from '80s English musical duo Wham!

Critical reception
"Done for Me" was well received by music critics. Hugh McIntyre of Forbes deemed the song "a slightly soulful, but still primarily poppy affair", writing that "it fits in perfectly with what Puth has been doling out during this era". He noticed the song's funk influences, praising Puth for "relying primarily on his own talent to deliver some of the best pop created with actual instruments (as opposed to utilizing solely computers and studio wizardry) being released today", despite his ability to "partner with any top-tier producer in the business". Morgan Enos of Billboard described the song as "both classic-sounding in that big-board, Thriller vein of records and modern-seeming without adding too many 2010s signifiers". Mike Nied of Idolator praised the song, writing: "Boasting a danceable beat and enviable production, it is shaping up to be another surefire hit."

Music video
The official music video was released on April 21, 2018, on YouTube.

Track listing

Credits and personnel
Credits adapted from Qobuz.
 Charlie Puth – composition, production, programming, vocals, instruments
 Kehlani – composition, vocals
 Jacob Kasher – composition
 John Ryan – composition
 Ryan Gladieux – additional recording
 Engineer - Manny Marroquin
 Mastering Engineer - Dave Kutch

Charts

Weekly charts

Year-end charts

Certifications

Release history

References

External links
 

2010s ballads
2018 singles
2018 songs
Atlantic Records singles
Charlie Puth songs
Kehlani songs
Pop ballads
Songs written by John Ryan (musician)
Songs written by Jacob Kasher
Songs written by Charlie Puth
Songs written by Kehlani
Soul ballads
Male–female vocal duets